Conformal cooling channel is a cooling passageway which follows the shape or profile of the mould core or cavity to perform rapid uniform cooling process for injection moulding or blow moulding processes.

Further reading

References

Injection molding